Jędrzej Śniadecki (archaic Andrew Sniadecki; ; 30 November 1768 – 11 May 1838) was a Polish writer, physician, chemist, biologist and philosopher. His achievements include being the first person who linked rickets to lack of sunlight. He also created modern Polish terminology in the field of chemistry.

Life and work

Śniadecki was born in Żnin (Greater Poland region) in the Polish–Lithuanian Commonwealth. After completing his university studies at the Chief Crown School in Kraków, he resided for some time in Italy and Scotland. In 1797, he was appointed to the Chair of Chemistry in the Medicine Faculty at the Main School in Vilnius (Wilno, Vilna), which in 1803 was renamed the Imperial University of Vilna. One of his students was Ignacy Domeyko. Śniadecki was also one of the main organizers and head of the recently created Wilno Medical-Surgical Academy. In 1806–1836 he headed the local Medical Scientific Society, one of the premier scientific societies in the region.

Śniadecki's most important book was Początki chemii (The Beginnings of Chemistry), the first Polish-language chemistry textbook, prepared for the Commission of National Education. It was considered one of the best Polish scientific textbooks of the age and was used in Polish universities well into the 1930s. Śniadecki was also known as a writer of less serious works; a co-founder of Towarzystwo Szubrawców (The Wastrel Society), he contributed articles to its satirical weekly, Wiadomości Brukowe (The Pavement News). He also wrote copiously in Wiadomości Wileńskie (The Vilnius' News), the largest and most prestigious daily in Vilnius.

In 1807, Śniadecki announced he had discovered a new metal in platinum and called it "vestium". Three years later, Académie de France published a note saying that the experiment could not be reproduced. Discouraged by this, Śniadecki dropped all his claims and did not talk about vestium anymore. 
Nevertheless, there have been speculations that this new element was ruthenium, found 37 years later by Karl Klaus. However, they are not accepted by modern sources.

Jędrzej was the brother of Jan Śniadecki and father of Ludwika Śniadecka. He died in Vilnius and is buried at the Horodnyki Cemetery in Ashmyany district in Belarus.

See also
 History of philosophy in Poland
 List of Poles

References

Further reading

External links
 Works by Jędrzej Śniadecki in digital library Polona

1768 births
1838 deaths
Polish biologists
Polish chemists
Enlightenment philosophers
Academic staff of Vilnius University
18th-century Polish–Lithuanian writers
18th-century chemists
19th-century Polish scholars
19th-century chemists
Ruthenium
19th-century Polish male writers
19th-century Polish scientists
People from Żnin County
18th-century male writers
Burials at Rasos Cemetery
18th-century Polish–Lithuanian philosophers
19th-century Polish philosophers
Polish Enlightenment